The 2017–18 season was Real Sporting's 112th season in existence and the club's 45th season in the second flight of Spanish football, the first one since its last relegation. It covers a period from 1 July 2017 to 30 June 2018.

Season overview

Pre-season

On 28 May 2017, Real Sporting sacked Nicolás Rodríguez after three seasons as director of football, and hired Miguel Torrecilla with the aim to replace him.

On 9 June 2017, the club announced Asturian enterprise Teslacard as the new shirt sponsor of the club. One day later, Rubi confirmed that the club would not extend his contract for one more season.

On 15 June 2017, Paco Herrera was hired as new coach after agreeing with the club a two-year contract. One week later, Nacho Cases announced he would leave the club, bringing to an end his 22-year association with the club.

Álex Bergantiños and Stefan Šćepović were the first signs, both loaned from their clubs. Šćepović came back to Gijón three season after. On 20 July 2017, Jorge Meré was transferred to German Köln for €9,000,000, becoming the highest transfer in the club's history. Four days later, he would be replaced by Italian center back Federico Barba, who signed for the next four seasons. Real Sporting paid €1,700,000 to Italian club Empoli F.C.

On 1 August 2017, Real Sporting ended the renewal of season tickets with 21,274; the club's record in Segunda División. Two days later, the club announced that Carlos Castro and Carlos Carmona renewed their contracts until 2022 and 2021 respectively.

Pre-season ended with five more incorporations, two of them on loan: Xandão, Juan Sebastián Quintero (on loan from Deportivo Cali), Michael Santos (on loan from Málaga), Álex Pérez and Álex López.

August
Sporting played their first official match of the season on 19 August 2017, earning one point at Alcorcón. Due to the high temperatures during the game, cooling breaks were introduced. This arrangement was used for the first time in Spain during this season. Eight days later, the club made its home debut against Lugo and achieved the first win of the season, after beating the Galicians by 2–0. Carlos Carmona and Michael Santos scored the goals for the win that positioned Real Sporting in the second place at the end of the second round.

In this match, Nacho Méndez made his professional debut as a starter, but he was replaced during the halftime. One day later, on 29 August, Real Sporting agreed with Eibar the loan of right back Jordi Calavera for one season.

On 31 August 2017, Real Sporting ended the transfer window by rescinding the contracts of Lillo and Dani Ndi and loaning Jean-Sylvain Babin to Maccabi Tel Aviv.

September

On 3 September 2017, Real Sporting reached the first position of the table after beating Gimnàstic 4–0 away and taking advantage of the loss of Tenerife against Valladolid. This leadership arrived just one week before playing the Asturian derby against Oviedo, 14 years after both teams meet for the last time in official competition. The derby ended with a 1–1 draw, despite scoring first thanks to a header of Carlos Carmona, as Oviedo made the equalizer with only five minutes left. Before it, in the surroundings of the stadium, there were altercations between the National Police and the ultras of Real Sporting, ending with damages in the buses of both clubs and 12 arrested people.

Real Sporting lost its first match, one week later, in Soria, after being defeated 0–3 by Numancia. Three days later, Real Sporting was eliminated by this team after drawing 1–1 and losing 1–3 in the penalty shootout. Previously, they beat Reus in the first round.

The club ended the month in the first position, after beating Lorca FC and taking advantage of other results. However, despite the leadership, the performance of the club was criticized by an important crowd of the supporters.

October
Criticism to the team play continued after the 2–0 defeat on 1 October against Osasuna. However, the club continued unbeaten at home by achieving a new win at El Molinón, this time by 3–0 against Sevilla Atlético. In this match, Real Sporting missed two penalty kicks: firstly Stefan Šćepović, who scored twice, and later Carlos Castro in the additional time, after trying a Panenka.

The club continued the undefeated streak at Estadio Reino de León, where they beat Cultural Leonesa by 2–0, in a match where 2,000 supporters travelled to León for a match played on Tuesday and later, only earning a 1–1 draw against Huesca despite going ahead.

On 16 October, Real Sporting announced, despite the relegation, it beat the record of season tickets sold with 24,402. The club ended the month with four more points after a 1–1 draw at Rayo Vallecano and a 2–0 win at home against Almería, for a streak of five consecutive matches without losses that allowed the club to end October in the third position, with the same points as second qualified Granada, and only one point less than Lugo, that reached the leadership of the league for the first time in their history.

November

November was disastrous for Sporting, who only earned two points in the four matches played in this month.

It started with a loss at the Estadi Municipal de Reus, against Reus, by 1–0, after a free kick scored by Luís Gustavo. One week later, Real Sporting tied in the homer match against Valladolid, in another game where Sporting could not save the three points after scoring first, in a match were Sergio Álvarez got injured in the warm up.

The crisis increased in the club after the first loss at home, on 21 November, against Cádiz by 0–3 with former player David Barral scoring the last goal, and dropped to the eighth position in the league table. This match was remarkable as it was the first one ever without any Asturian player in the starting team. The month ended with an away 2–2 draw against Albacete, with Michael Santos scoring a brace for overcoming the first goal of Roman Zozulya.

December

Sporting accumulated two losses against Zaragoza and Barcelona B, increasing the streak to six matches without wins. With these numbers, the club dropped to the tenth position in the league table.

On 11 December, the board of directors agreed to sack Paco Herrera and to hire former Valencia player Rubén Baraja as the new head coach. Baraja was confirmed as manager on 12 December. He started his tenure in Sporting with a huge win by 3–0 against Tenerife, but the team showed the same problems when it plays away, during the match at Granada, that ended with a 1–2 loss.

On 22 December, B-side player Nacho Méndez extended his contract until 2021.

January

2018 started for Sporting with a 3–2 win against Córdoba, that were in relegation positions, with Michael Santos netting his second brace in the season. In this match, Sergio Álvarez came back to the starting XI after an absence of one month due to an injury.

On 11 January, former player Jony arrived to Gijón for signing until the end of the season, on loan from Málaga. The club announced his return the next day. One day later after the press release, Real Sporting won again in their second match of the year, this time against Alcorcón by a wide 3–0.

On 18 January, goalkeeper Diego Mariño extended his contract with the club until 2022. One day later, Rachid Aït-Atmane was loaned to Belgian side Waasland-Beveren. and on 20 January, Real Sporting lost 3–1 to CD Lugo, in a match where after four missed penalty kicks, Carmona netted one. Also in this game, rival goalkeeper Juan Carlos scored a goal.

On 26 January, midfielder Moi Gómez was loaned to Huesca until the end of the season. Just minutes later, the club announced the sign up of Hernán Santana from La Liga club Las Palmas, until 2021.

The last match of the month ended with a 2–0 win against Gimnàstic thanks to a new goal of Michael Santos and other one made by Rubén García. This was the debut with the first team of right back Adrián Montoro.

In the last day of the month, Getafe and Sporting agreed to terminate the loan of Stefan Šćepović, who played 16 league games and scored four goals in his second stage in Gijón, and was transferred to Hungarian club Videoton. And just hours before the end of the winter market, Real Sporting agreed the loans of Nano Mesa from Eibar and Alberto Guitián, who played in Sporting three years ago, from Valladolid.

February
On 4 February, Real Sporting lost 2–1 against Oviedo in the second Asturian derby of the season, despite scoring first thanks to a goal of Jony. However, the team redeemed itself by beating Numancia in the next week by 2–0, achieving coach Rubén Baraja his fifth consecutive win at El Molinón.

In the third match of the month, Real Sporting continued without winning away and only could earn one goalless draw against Lorca FC, that cut their streak of ten consecutive losses. Jony missed a penalty kick in the first half, becoming this one the fifth shot missed in the season out of seven tries.

The last match of the month ended with a new home win, the sixth consecutive, against Osasuna by 2–0, with goals of Rubén García and Michael Santos, and the team showing a completely different performance at home and away.

On 27 February, all-time Sporting's top scorer Quini passed away at the age of 68 after suffering a heart attack.

March

With a 0–1 win against last qualified Sevilla Atlético, Real Sporting came back to the play-offs positions fifteen rounds after the last time. Sporting continued their unbeaten streak by defeating 4–0 Cultural Leonesa, in a match where Quini was honored, and leaders Huesca away by 2–0.

On 24 March, Real Sporting beat the leader again, this time Rayo Vallecano thanks to an own goal. Goalkeeper Diego Mariño continued unbeaten by seventh consecutive match.

April
On 1 April, Real Sporting came back provisionally to the leadership after beating 1–3 Almería and taking advantage of the draw between Rayo Vallecano and Cádiz and the postponement of the match between Huesca and Albacete. Michael Santos, who scored his 16th goal in the first minutes, became injured and Diego Mariño ended his streak of 764 minutes unbeaten by receiving a penalty kick scored by Rubén Alcaraz. One week later, the team beat Reus 2–1 for earning their seventh consecutive win, equaling the best streak of the club, in the 1979–80 season.

This record would be beaten at Valladolid, by achieving also the tenth consecutive match without losing. Rubén García scored the only goal in the game played at Estadio José Zorrilla, with more than 4,000 supporters who travelled from Gijón for watching the match. The winning streak would end after a goalless draw at Estadio Ramón de Carranza, against Cádiz CF. However, Real Sporting would continue their streak of 11 games unbeaten, all the league matches played after losing the Asturian derby.

On 25 April 2018, Jony was named Player of the Month of March. He received the award at El Molinón on 29 April, before the last match of the month, that ended with a 2–1 win against Albacete. He and Carmona scored the goals for continuing in the second position after 37 rounds played.

May

Real Sporting could not continue their unbeaten streak and was dropped to the third position after a 2–1 loss against Real Zaragoza at La Romareda. In the two next weeks, the club would practically end its options to directly promote to La Liga after another two consecutive losses: firstly a surprising one at El Molinón, by 2–3 against Barcelona and later, against Tenerife with a goal in the 81st minute. In the first of these two matches, manager Rubén Baraja was sent off and later sanctioned with four matches after impeding a throw-in.

On 27 May, with the win of Rayo Vallecano against Lugo and the win in the previous round of Huesca against the same team, Real Sporting terminated its options to directly promote to La Liga. However, a 2–1 win against Granada was enough to assure the qualification to the promotion playoffs.

June
Real Sporting finished the regular season with a calamitous 3–0 loss at Córdoba, ending the regular season in the fourth place and losing the status of top seeded team in the promotion playoffs

The first match of this stage was played on 7 June at Estadio José Zorrilla, Valladolid. The Castilians beat Real Sporting by 3–1 thanks to ten great minutes where they scored the three goals. Jony nailed in the second half the only goal for the Asturians.

There were not any options for Real Sporting at the second leg, as Valladolid quickly avoided any possibility of comeback with two goals in the first half of the match. Carmona, booed when he was replaced, made the last goal of the season by scoring a penalty kick in the 68th minute.

Players

Current squad

From the reserve team

In

Out

Current technical staff

Managerial changes

Pre-season and friendlies
Due to the conservation works of the pitch of El Molinón, the Trofeo Villa de Gijón was not played this pre-season.

Competitions

Segunda División

League table

Results summary

Positions by round

Matches

Play-offs

Matches

Copa del Rey

Statistics

Appearances and goals

|-
|colspan="12"|Players who have left the club after the start of the season:

Disciplinary record

|-
|colspan=17 align=left|Players who have left the club after the start of the season:

References

External links

Sporting de Gijón seasons
Sporting de Gijon
Sporting de Gijon